St. Mary's Higher Secondary school is an educational institution established in 1944 by Rev.Father Caussanal. and run by the brothers of sacred heart who also run various other schools in Tamil Nadu 

The school is situated amidst the lush green paddy fields of Vickramasingapuram, in Tirunelveli district of Tamil Nadu, close to Papanasam and Lower dam.

Students can attend from classes 6 to 12 and can undertake education both in Tamil and English as their medium of instruction

Middle and High School

St. Mary's Middle / High school comprises classes VI - X. Apart from their regular curriculum, students are taught with Computer science, Moral Science and General Knowledge, and also given a choice from a range of activities. On the completion of a class topic, students are often asked to prepare individual or group projects to demonstrate what they have understood and learnt from the lessons. Group discussions are also carried out to exchange ideas and viewpoints. Once a week extra-curricular activities like yoga and western dance are conducted. Students are motivated and given opportunity to compete in their chosen activity in both internal and external competitions.

Senior School 

St. Mary's Senior School offers various groups as part of their Higher secondary curriculum as below:

1.Mathematics, Physics, Chemistry, Biology (Tamil & English Medium)

2.Mathematics, Physics, Chemistry, Computer Science (Tamil & English Medium)

3.Physics, Chemistry, Botany, Zoology (Tamil Medium)

4.Accountancy, Commerce, Economics, Business Maths (Tamil Medium)

5.Accountancy, Commerce, Economics, History (Tamil Medium)

6.Accountancy, Commerce, Economics, Computer Application (Tamil & English Medium)

7.Agricultural Practices - allied Subjects Computer Technology & Biology.

8.Office Secretaryship with Accountancy and Typewriting (E.M) allied Subject Commerce.

Notable alumni
Actor and Politician Vijayakanth studied here

Hostel
St.Mary's Hostel is  situated amidst the foot steps of Pothigai hills, River banks of Thamirabarani and lushy green fields of Vickramasingapuram, in Tirunelveli district of Tamil Nadu.

In 1950, it was started by the Brothers of Sacred Heart of Jesus, Palayamkottai for the students of St.Mary's Hr.Sec.School.

References

External links
emmanuel2000 

Catholic secondary schools in India
Christian schools in Tamil Nadu
High schools and secondary schools in Tamil Nadu
Education in Tirunelveli district